Elmer Forrest Arterburn Jr. (June 15, 1929 - May 31, 2019) was an American football defensive back who played for the Chicago Cardinals. He played college football at Texas Tech University, having previously attended Ranger High School.

References

1929 births
2019 deaths
American football defensive backs
Texas Tech Red Raiders football players
Chicago Cardinals players
Players of American football from Oklahoma